Niassia (also spelled Nyassia) is a village and commune in Ziguinchor Department, Ziguinchor Region, Casamance, Senegal.

Administration
Niassia is the capital of the rural community of Niassia and Niassia district. The commune contains villages such as Badème, Bassere, Kadiene, Goudoume, Atoure, Toubacouta, Babonda, Djililo and Bagame. The current president of the Nyassia Rural Community (as of January 2013) is Parfait Sagna.

Geography
The nearest towns are Bafikane, Badionkoton, Katio, Etome, and Kailou.

External links
  Maps, weather and airports for Niassia

Populated places in the Ziguinchor Department